The Contact Show was an Australian daytime television variety series which aired on TCN-9 during 1960. Featuring Bob Geraghty and George Wallace Jnr, it featured a mix of comedy and music.

The series proved short-lived.

Aired at 2:00PM in a 60-minute time-slot, the series competed in its time-slot against Your Home and Menus for Moderns on ATN-7 and For Schools on ABN-2.

See also 
 List of Australian television series
 The George Wallace Show
 Theatre Royal

References

External links
The Contact Show at IMDb

Black-and-white Australian television shows
Australian variety television shows
1960 Australian television series debuts
1960 Australian television series endings
English-language television shows